The Pakistan cricket team toured Sri Lanka from June to August 2009. The team played three Test matches, five One Day Internationals, and one Twenty20 International against Sri Lanka. The tour was the return tour of the Sri Lankan cricket team in Pakistan in 2008–09, where during the second test the match was abandoned due to a terrorist attack on the Sri Lankan cricket team which injured seven players, three staff and killed six Pakistani policemen and two civilians.

Pakistan played a first-class game against Sri Lanka Cricket XI which was drawn. They will play a List A game.  The tour continued from 29 June 2009 to 12 August 2009.

Build up
The series came just two weeks after Pakistan defeated Sri Lanka in ICC world T20 cup final.  The Pakistani coach Intikhab Alam was satisfied by the security being provided by the Sri Lankan government, but was concerned about his team shift from T20 cricket to Test cricket.  He said,

"The key to winning the series against a strong Sri Lankan team will be our ability to adjust to demanding Test match cricket in hot and humid weather. We can’t afford to look back. Winning the Twenty20 title will mean little when the first ball is bowled in the Test series.  It’s a different ball game."

Pakistan has never lost a series in Sri Lanka, winning past three, and drawing two. The Pakistani side has been boosted by return of Mohammad Yousuf and Abdul Razzaq.

From the 19 Test matches played between Pakistan and Sri Lanka in last five years, Pakistan have won 13, lost 2 and Drawn 4.

Kumar Sangakkara, for whom this is the first Test series as a captain, brushing aside the effects of Lahore attacks and loss to Pakistan in ICC T20 worldcup, said that;

"Lahore is not on our minds, the team has done a really great job mentally getting over it, it was heartbreaking to lose the Twenty20 final but we had a great tournament. I am proud of the way the team played in England and I am confident we will do as well in the Test matches."

Test Squads

Sri Lanka Cricket XI for pre-series matches

Thilina Kandamby (C)
Gihan Rupasinghe
Kaushal Silva
Farveez Maharoof
Chamara Kapugedera
Nuwan Pradeep
Tharanga Paranavitana
Muthumudalige Pushpakumara
Dilhara Fernando
Suraj Mohamed
Milinda Siriwardana
Upul Tharanga
Lahiru Thirimanne

Test series
The test series consisted of three Test matches at Galle International Stadium in Galle, Paikiasothy Saravanamuttu Stadium in Colombo and Sinhalese Sports Club Ground also in Colombo.

1st Test
Muttiah Muralitharan was ruled out for First Test after injuring his knee during fielding practice. He was replaced in the side for the first test by Rangana Herath.

2nd Test

3rd Test

ODI series
There was five ODIs and one T20 International, played between 30 July and 9 August. They were played at the Rangiri Dambulla International Stadium in Dambulla and R Premadasa Stadium in Colombo.

1st ODI

2nd ODI

3rd ODI

4th ODI

5th ODI

Only Twenty20

Tour matches

First class:Sri Lanka Cricket XI v Pakistanis

List A:Sri Lanka A v Pakistanis

Security
Tight security has been arranged for visiting team, with Sri Lankan government deploying more than 100 Special Task Force personnel for VIP protection.  Stringent measures have been put in place, particularly focusing on security along the routes from hotels to match venues.

Fireworks, musical bands, glass bottles, tin cans, sharp objects, laser pointers and mirrors are banned in the Stadiums.  Except national flags of Sri Lanka and Pakistan, no banners, posters and discriminating slogans will be allowed in the ground.

The series has started just a month after the Sri Lankan Civil war came to an end.

Match fixing
Pakistan team management complained with hotel management in Colombo over the presence of suspected Indian makers. Express, a mainstream Urdu daily, claimed in a report that some unidentified Indian bookies approached several Pakistani players during the second and third Tests against Sri Lanka in Colombo. Yawar Saeed, the Pakistan team manager said that the incidents did happen but the team management took appropriate steps to erase any chances of further contacts between the players and the bookies.

Media coverage

Television Networks
Ten Sports (Live) – India, Pakistan, Malaysia, Indonesia and Middle East
Prime Sports (Live) – Middle East
Zee Cinema (Live) – United Kingdom
Zee Muzic (highlights) – United Kingdom
SuperSport (Live) – South Africa, Kenya, Zimbabwe and rest of Africa
Direct TV (Live) – USA

References

Sri Lanka
2009 in Sri Lankan cricket
International cricket competitions in 2009
2009
Sri Lankan cricket seasons from 2000–01